23S rRNA pseudouridine746 synthase (RluA, 23S RNA PSI746 synthase, 23S rRNA pseudouridine synthase, pseudouridine synthase RluA) is an enzyme with systematic name 23S rRNA-uridine746 uracil mutase. This enzyme catalyses the following chemical reaction

 23S rRNA uridine746  23S rRNA pseudouridine746

RluA is the only protein responsible for the in vivo formation of 23S RNA pseudouridine746.

References

External links 
 

EC 5.4.99